Oscar Andrews (24 July 1876 – 30 October 1956) was an Irish cricket and field hockey player. When playing cricket he was a right-handed batsman and a right-arm medium pace bowler.

He made his debut for Irish cricket team in their first first-class match against London County in May 1902, and went on to play for them seven times, his last game coming against Philadelphia in September 1909. His cousin also played for Ireland.

Whilst he did not again feature for the Irish national side, he was seen to play for an Ulster side against the touring Indian cricket team in 1911 and for a North of Ireland side against Wales in 1924. He also played for the Ireland national field hockey team in 1899. His field hockey career was marked by playing in the first club match in Ulster in November 1896 in which he scored six goals.

References
Wisden obituaries for 1956

CricketEurope Stats Zone profile
Article about history of North Down Hockey Club

1876 births
1956 deaths
Irish cricketers
Irish male field hockey players
Gentlemen of Ireland cricketers
Ireland international men's field hockey players